Star Rise is a remix from two previous Nusrat Fateh Ali Khan–Michael Brook collaborations. The album was dedicated to the memory of Khan, who died prior to the album's completion, and released posthumously by Real World Records.

Tracks 1, 2, 5, 6, and 8 are remixed from the 1996 album Night Song.
Tracks 3, 4, 7, and 9 are remixed from the 1990 album Mustt Mustt.

According to the Star Rise liner notes, the Nitin Sawhney remix of Tracery, created after Khan's death, is the only track not to receive Khan's feedback.

Track listing 

Michael Brook albums
Remix albums published posthumously
Nusrat Fateh Ali Khan albums
1997 remix albums
Real World Records remix albums